Pál Bajai, O.F.M., was a Hungarian Franciscan friar of the Observant reform and spiritual writer during the 18th century. His only surviving work is De gratiis atque beneficiis beatissimae V. Mariae Reginae in Ungaria (On the Favors and Blessings of the Most Blessed Virgin Mary, Queen of Hungary), published in 1766.

Sources
 

1700s births
1700s deaths
Hungarian Friars Minor
18th-century Latin-language writers
18th-century male writers
18th-century Hungarian male writers